Revaz "Rezo" Cheishvili (Georgian: რევაზ „რეზო“ ჭეიშვილი; 24 April 1933 – 11 September 2015) was a Georgian writer and scriptwriter.

Biography 
Cheishvili was born in Kutaisi, Georgian SSR, Soviet Union in 1933. He moved to the capital in 1954 to continue his studies. In 1958 he graduated from Tbilisi State University with a degree in Georgian language and literature.
 
He worked from 1961 to 1992 at the 'Georgian Film' studio as an editor, as a member of the Film Script Administrative Board, as a member of the Creative Association and as one of its leaders. He edited various Georgian literary journals and newspapers, including Gantiadi.

Rezo Cheishvili was the scriptwriter of feature-length films My Friend Nodari, Samanishvili’s Stepmother and the widely famed The Blue Mountains, which was directed by noted Georgian director Eldar Shengelaia.

Cheishvili's short stories and novels have been published in several countries.

Bibliography 
 Blue Mountains (1980); Bakur Sulakauri Publishing (2013) 
 Oh, My Vineyard, Merani Publishing (1987); Bakur Sulakauri Publishing (2003)
 First, Sov. Georgia Publishing (1988)
 Selected Works in two Volumes, Sov. Georgia (1989-1993)
 My Friend Nodar, Nakaduli Publishing (1990)
 Dali, Merani Publishing (1992)
 Robbers, Merani Publishing (1999)
 A Comet, Merani Publishing (1999)
 Third Way: About Kutaisi and others, Kutaisi publishing Centre (2003)
 Selected Short Stories, Kutaisi publishing Centre (2003)
 Month of Ripening, Kutaisi publishing Centre (2003)
 Three Novels, Kutaisi publishing Centre (2003)
 Red Flower of Wild Rose, Palitra L Publishing (2010)
 Works in Seven Volumes, Kutaisi publishing Centre (2010-2012)
 New Kuru, Palitra L Publishing (2011)

Recognition 
 USSR State Award for the script of The Blue Mountains (1984)
 Rustaveli Award (1985)
 Honorary SABA award (2012)

References

External links

 CHEISHVILI REZO
 Rezo Cheishvili, Georgian National Filmography

Male writers from Georgia (country)
Tbilisi State University alumni
1933 births
2015 deaths
Novelists from Georgia (country)
Dramatists and playwrights from Georgia (country)
Screenwriters from Georgia (country)
20th-century writers from Georgia (country)
21st-century writers from Georgia (country)
Postmodern writers
Magic realism writers
20th-century dramatists and playwrights from Georgia (country)
21st-century dramatists and playwrights from Georgia (country)